Portsalon is a coastal townland in County Donegal, Ireland. It's situated on the scenic Lough Swilly and it is known for its beach, which was deemed to be the second most beautiful beach in the world by The Observer newspaper.

Up until the second half of the 20th century, there was very little in the area. Now it is a tourist resort and many visitors have built holiday homes around Portsalon.

Recent times
September 2019, Donegal County Council took action to  tackle flooding problems at Portsalon.

References

Geography of County Donegal